The 1886 United States House of Representatives elections were held for the most part on November 2, 1886, with three states holding theirs early between June and September. They occurred in the middle of President Grover Cleveland's first term. Elections were held for 325 seats of the United States House of Representatives, representing 38 states, to serve in the 50th United States Congress. Special elections were also held throughout the year.

As in many midterm elections, the President's party lost seats to the opposition, in this case, Democrats lost seats to Republicans, although a narrow majority was retained.  Many of these Republican pickups were in the industrializing Midwest states, where the debate over tariffs, which were advocated by Republicans to protect domestic industry but opposed by Democrats to allow for free agricultural trade, led to political change. The small Labor Party, supported by industrial workers, gained one seat each in Virginia and Wisconsin, while the Greenback Party maintained its one seat in Iowa (James B. Weaver). One Independent was also elected in North Carolina.

Election summaries

There were 2 Labor and 1 Independent members elected, and 1 Greenback member re-elected. The previous election saw just the Greenback elected.

Special elections 

|-
! 
| Lewis Beach
|  | Democratic
| 1880
|  | Incumbent died August 10, 1886.New member elected November 2, 1886.Democratic hold.Successor also elected the same day to the next term, see below.
| nowrap | 

|-
! 
| Joseph Rankin
|  | Democratic
| 1882
|  | Incumbent died January 24, 1886.New member elected February 23, 1886.Democratic hold.
| nowrap | 

|}

Election dates 
In all the states except three, elections were held November 2, 1886. Those three states, with 7 seats among them, held elections:

 June 7, 1886: Oregon
 September 7, 1886: Vermont
 September 10, 1886: Maine

Alabama

Arkansas

Arizona Territory 
See Non-voting delegates, below.

California 

|-
! 
| Barclay Henley
|  | Democratic
| 1882
|  | Incumbent retired.New member elected.Democratic hold
| nowrap | 

|-
! 
| James A. Louttit
|  | Republican
| 1884
|  | Incumbent retired.New member elected.Democratic gain.
| nowrap | 

|-
! 
| Joseph McKenna
|  | Republican
| 1884
| Incumbent re-elected.
| nowrap | 

|-
! 
| William W. Morrow
|  | Republican
| 1884
| Incumbent re-elected.
| nowrap | 

|-
! 
| Charles N. Felton
|  | Republican
| 1884
| Incumbent re-elected.
| nowrap | 

|-
! 
| Henry Markham
|  | Republican
| 1884
|  | Incumbent retired.New member elected.Republican hold
| nowrap | 

|}

Colorado

Connecticut

Dakota Territory 
See Non-voting delegates, below.

Delaware

Florida

|-
! 
| Robert H. M. Davidson
|  | Democratic
| 1876
| Incumbent re-elected.
| nowrap | 

|-
! 
| Charles Dougherty
|  | Democratic
| 1884
| Incumbent re-elected.
| nowrap | 

|}

Georgia

Idaho Territory 
See Non-voting delegates, below.

Illinois

Indiana

Iowa

Kansas

Kentucky

Louisiana

Maine

Maryland

Massachusetts 

|-
! 
| Robert T. Davis
|  | Republican
| 1882
| Incumbent re-elected.
| nowrap | 

|-
! 
| John Davis Long
|  | Republican
| 1882
| Incumbent re-elected.
| nowrap | 

|-
! 
| Ambrose A. Ranney
|  | Republican
| 1880
|  | Incumbent lost re-election.New member elected.Democratic gain.
| nowrap | 

|-
! 
| Patrick A. Collins
|  | Democratic
| 1882
| Incumbent re-elected.
| nowrap | 

|-
! 
| Edward D. Hayden
|  | Republican
| 1884
| Incumbent re-elected.
| nowrap | 

|-
! 
| Henry B. Lovering
|  | Democratic
| 1882
|  | Incumbent lost re-election.New member elected.Republican gain.
| nowrap | 

|-
! 
| Eben F. Stone
|  | Republican
| 1880
|  | Incumbent retired.New member elected.Republican hold.
| nowrap | 

|-
! 
| Charles Herbert Allen
|  | Republican
| 1884
| Incumbent re-elected.
| nowrap | 

|-
! 
| Frederick D. Ely
|  | Republican
| 1884
|  | Incumbent lost re-election.New member elected.Democratic gain.
| nowrap | 
|-
! 
| William W. Rice
|  | Republican
| 1876
|  | Incumbent lost re-election.New member elected.Democratic gain.
| nowrap | 
|-
! 
| William Whiting II
|  | Republican
| 1882
| Incumbent re-elected.
| nowrap | 
|-
! 
| Francis W. Rockwell
|  | Republican
| 1884 (special)
| Incumbent re-elected.
| nowrap | 
|}

Michigan 

|-
! 
| John Logan Chipman
|  | Democratic
| 1886
|  | Incumbent retired.New member elected.Democratic hold.
| nowrap | 

|-
! 
| Edward P. Allen
|  | Republican
| 1886
|  | Incumbent retired.New member elected.Republican gain.
| nowrap | 

|-
! 
| James O'Donnell
|  | Republican
| 1884
| Incumbent re-elected.
| nowrap | 

|-
! 
| Julius C. Burrows
|  | Republican
| 1872
| Incumbent re-elected.
| nowrap | 

|-
! 
| Melbourne H. Ford
|  | Democratic
| 1886
|  | Incumbent retired.New member elected.Democratic hold.
| nowrap | 

|-
! 
| Mark S. Brewer
|  | Republican
| 1876
|  | Incumbent retired.New member elected.Republican gain.
| nowrap | 

|-
! 
| Justin R. Whiting
|  | Democratic  Greenback
| 1886
|  | Incumbent retired.New member elected.Democratic hold.
| nowrap | 

|-
! 
| Timothy E. Tarsney
|  | Democratic
| 1884
| Incumbent re-elected.
| nowrap | 

|-
! 
| Byron M. Cutcheon
|  | Republican
| 1882
| Incumbent re-elected.
| nowrap | 

|-
! 
| Spencer O. Fisher
|  | DemocraticFusion
| 1884
| Incumbent re-elected.
| nowrap | 

|-
! 
| Seth C. Moffatt
|  | Democratic
| 1884
| Incumbent re-elected.
| nowrap | 

|}

Minnesota

Mississippi 

|-
! 
| John M. Allen
|  | Democratic
| 1884
| Incumbent re-elected.
| nowrap | 

|-
! 
| James B. Morgan
|  | Democratic
| 1884
| Incumbent re-elected.
| nowrap | 

|-
! 
| Thomas C. Catchings
|  | Democratic
| 1884
| Incumbent re-elected.
| nowrap | 

|-
! 
| Frederick G. Barry
|  | Democratic
| 1884
| Incumbent re-elected.
| nowrap | 

|-
! 
| Otho R. Singleton
|  | Democratic
| 1874
|  | Incumbent retired.New member elected.Democratic hold.
| nowrap | 

|-
! 
| Henry S. Van Eaton
|  | Democratic
| 1882
|  | Incumbent retired.New member elected.Democratic hold.
| nowrap | 

|-
! 
| Ethelbert Barksdale
|  | Democratic
| 1882
|  | Incumbent lost renomination.New member elected.Democratic hold.
| nowrap | 

|}

Missouri

Montana Territory 
See Non-voting delegates, below.

Nebraska 

|-
! 
| Archibald J. Weaver
|  | Republican 
| 1882
|  | Incumbent retired.New member elected.Democratic gain.
| nowrap | 

|-
! 
| James Laird
|  | Republican 
| 1882
| Incumbent re-elected.
| nowrap | 

|-
! 
| George W. E. Dorsey
|  | Republican 
| 1884
| Incumbent re-elected.
| nowrap | 

|}

Nevada

New Hampshire

New Jersey

New Mexico Territory 
See Non-voting delegates, below.

New York 

|-
! 
| Lewis Beach
|  | Democratic
| 1880
|  | Incumbent died August 10, 1886.New member elected.Democratic hold.Successor also elected the same day to finish the current term.
| nowrap | 

|}

North Carolina

Ohio

Oregon

Pennsylvania

Rhode Island

South Carolina

|-
! 
| Samuel Dibble
|  | Democratic
| 1882
| Incumbent re-elected.
| nowrap | 

|-
! 
| George D. Tillman
|  | Democratic
| 1878
| Incumbent re-elected.
| nowrap | 

|-
! 
| D. Wyatt Aiken
|  | Democratic
| 1876
|  | Incumbent retired.New member elected.Democratic hold.
| nowrap | 

|-
! 
| William H. Perry
|  | Democratic
| 1884
| Incumbent re-elected.
| nowrap | 

|-
! 
| John J. Hemphill
|  | Democratic
| 1882
| Incumbent re-elected.
| nowrap | 

|-
! 
| George W. Dargan
|  | Democratic
| 1882
| Incumbent re-elected.
| nowrap | 

|-
! 
| Robert Smalls
|  | Republican
| 1884 
|  | Incumbent lost re-election.New member elected.Democratic gain.
| nowrap | 

|}

Tennessee 

|-
! 
| Augustus H. Pettibone
|  | Republican
| 1880
|  |Incumbent retired.New member elected.Republican hold.
| nowrap | 

|-
! 
| Leonidas C. Houk
|  | Republican
| 1878
| Incumbent re-elected.
| nowrap | 

|-
! 
| John R. Neal
|  | Democratic
| 1884
| Incumbent re-elected.
| nowrap | 

|-
! 
| Benton McMillin
|  | Democratic
| 1878
| Incumbent re-elected.
|  nowrap | 

|-
! 
| James D. Richardson
|  | Democratic
| 1884
| Incumbent re-elected.
| nowrap | 

|-
! 
| Andrew J. Caldwell
|  | Democratic
| 1882
|  |Incumbent retired.New member elected.Democratic hold.
| nowrap | 

|-
! 
| John G. Ballentine
|  | Democratic
| 1882
|  |Incumbent retired.New member elected.Democratic hold.
| nowrap | 

|-
! 
| John M. Taylor
|  | Democratic
| 1882
|  |Incumbent retired.New member elected.Democratic hold.
| nowrap | 

|-
! 
| Presley T. Glass
|  | Democratic
| 1884
| Incumbent re-elected.
| nowrap | 

|-
! 
| Zachary Taylor
|  | Republican
| 1884
|  |Incumbent lost re-election.New member elected.Democratic gain.
| 

|}

Texas

Utah Territory 
See Non-voting delegates, below.

Vermont

Virginia

Washington Territory 
See Non-voting delegates, below.

West Virginia 

|-
! 
| Nathan Goff Jr.
|  | Republican
| 1882
| Incumbent re-elected.
| nowrap | 

|-
! 
| William L. Wilson
|  | Democratic
| 1882
| Incumbent re-elected.
| nowrap | 

|-
! 
| Charles P. Snyder
|  | Democratic
| 1883 (special)
| Incumbent re-elected.
| nowrap | 

|-
! 
| Eustace Gibson
|  | Democratic
| 1882
|  | Incumbent lost renomination.New member elected.Democratic hold.
| nowrap | 

|}

Wisconsin 

Wisconsin elected nine members of congress on Election Day, November 2, 1886.

|-
! 
| Lucien B. Caswell
|  | Republican
| 1884
| Incumbent re-elected.
| nowrap | 

|-
! 
| Edward S. Bragg
|  | Democratic
| 1884
|  | Incumbent lost re-nomination.New member elected.Republican gain.
| nowrap | 

|-
! 
| Robert M. La Follette
|  | Republican
| 1884
| Incumbent re-elected.
| nowrap | 

|-
! 
| Isaac W. Van Schaick
|  | Republican
| 1884
| |  Incumbent declined re-nomination.New member elected.Labor gain.
| nowrap | 

|-
! 
| Thomas R. Hudd
|  | Democratic
| 1886Special
| Incumbent re-elected.
| nowrap | 

|-
! 
| Richard W. Guenther
|  | Republican
| 1880
| | Incumbent lost re-nomination.New member elected.Republican hold.
| nowrap | 

|-
! 
| Ormsby B. Thomas
|  | Republican
| 1884
| Incumbent re-elected.
| nowrap | 

|-
! 
| William T. Price
|  | Republican
| 1882
| Incumbent re-elected.
| nowrap | 

|-
! 
| Isaac Stephenson
|  | Republican
| 1882
| Incumbent re-elected.
| nowrap | 

|}

Wyoming Territory 
See Non-voting delegates, below.

Non-voting members 

|-
! 

|-
! 

|-
! 
| John Hailey
|  | Democratic
| 1884
|  | Incumbent lost re-election.New member elected.Republican gain.
| nowrap | 

|-
! 
| Joseph K. Toole
|  | Democratic
| 1884
| Incumbent re-elected.
| nowrap | 

|-
! 

|-
! 

|-
! 

|-
! 
| Joseph M. Carey
|  | Republican
| 1884
| Incumbent re-elected.
| nowrap | 

|}

See also
 1886 United States elections
 1886–87 United States Senate elections
 49th United States Congress
 50th United States Congress

Notes

References

Bibliography

External links
 Office of the Historian (Office of Art & Archives, Office of the Clerk, U.S. House of Representatives)